A personal submarine is a submarine, usually privately funded and constructed, which is usually primarily intended for recreational use.

Some are also used for scientific or military purposes.

Other uses include tourism, filming, water sporting, rescuing and spying. Migaloo submarine yacht). Those personal submarines which are available for sale cost from US$16,000 to 2+ Billion USD. A wide range of them is available from 1-person to 34+ occupants, some can go just 12 meters underwater and some can even reach to Mariana Trench.

Such submarines can be designed from scratch by the builder or built to available plans.

Records

See also

Recreational submarines
 Alicia (submarine)
 DeepFlight Merlin and the first of the Merlin series, Necker Nymph
 DeepFlight Super Falcon
 K-250 Submarine

Other submersibles
 Diver propulsion vehicle
 Midget submarine
 Wet Nellie
 DeepFlight Super Falcon

Manufacturers and organizations
 Personal Submersibles Organization
 U-Boat Worx
 Triton Submarines

References

Deep-submergence vehicles